Vicente Romero Fernández, (Cajamarca, 7 December 1955) is a retired general of the Peruvian National Police. He is the current Minister of the Interior of Peru since 13 January 2023 under the presidency of Dina Boluarte. He previously served as the Minister of the Interior under the presidency of Pedro Pablo Kuczynski from 9 January to 2 April 2018, after the resignation of Carlos Basombrío.

Career 
Romero specializes in internal order, public management and investment projects. In addition, he is an Intelligence analyst and has a degree in Administration. He trained in specialized courses in the Peruvian Armed Forces and abroad, such as counterterrorism at the Louisiana Police Academy, at the Grenadiers School of Colombia and a security course in Taiwan.

He was head of the Anti-Drug Executive Directorate (Dirandro) and Chief of Staff of the National Police.

He was director of the Peruvian National Police from 27 August 2015 to 11 September 2017.

Minister of Interior

Kuczynski government 
On December 27, 2017, Romero was sworn in as Minister of the Interior before President Pedro Pablo Kuczynski, replacing the resigning Carlos Basombrío Iglesias and at the proposal of Prime Minister Mercedes Araoz.

Romero served through the end of Kuczynski's presidency, formally resigning on 2 April 2018. President Martín Vizcarra appointed former police general Mauro Medina as Romero's successor at the ministry.

Boluarte government 
Romero was made Minister of Interior again in 2023 under the government of Dina Boluarte. Following the Peruvian National Police raid of the National University of San Marcos during the 2022–2023 Peruvian political protests, which resulted in 200 arrests, the Attorney General of Peru began preliminary investigations "for the alleged crime of omission of functional acts due to the police intervention"

References 

1955 births
Living people
Government ministers of Peru
21st-century Peruvian politicians